Stefani Zinerman is an American Democratic Party politician who currently represents New York State Assembly district 56, which includes Bedford-Stuyvesant and Crown Heights in Brooklyn, New York.

Personal life 
Zinerman grew up in Downtown Brooklyn in Gowanus public housing. Her parents were from Bedford-Stuyvesant, and lived in Clinton Hill, Brooklyn until they were able to move to Gowanus through the New York City Housing Authority. She credits her parents for encouraging her interest in politics.

Zinerman studied business management at the Rochester Institute of Technology. She worked in the banking industry and beverage distribution, and later was senior manager for a New York City adult literacy program.

Zinerman also served as a pastor and was involved in community organizations including the Brooklyn NAACP and Age-Friendly, a program she chaired that helps local leaders improve their communities for the elderly.

Politics 
Zinerman entered local politics after New York City Mayor Michael Bloomberg defunded the Begin Education/Employment Gain Independence Now (BEGIN) program; struck by the callousness of this decision against literacy and job training, she volunteered with the Obama For America campaign, becoming the Bedford-Stuyvesant neighborhood volunteer leader.

Zinerman served as Robert E. Cornegy's petition and campaign manager starting in 2012, and became his chief of staff once he was elected. As a staffer, she focused on serving the African American community of Bedford-Stuyvesant and Crown Heights, being a member of the Black, Latino and Asian Caucus with Cornegy, which worked on issues such as juvenile criminal justice reform and classifying the murder of Timothy Caughman as a hate crime.

When Tremaine Wright announced she would not be seeking reelection in the 56th Assembly District in order to instead run for State Senate, Zinerman announced her candidacy at the Weeksville Heritage Center, with the support of Wright. After winning the Democratic primary, she ran unopposed in November to take the seat.

Zinerman is a member of the Black, Puerto Rican, Hispanic & Asian Legislative Caucus.

Zinerman ran for the Assembly on a platform focusing on local concerns and constituent engagement, particularly community health and education equity. She advocates for several community-based health initiatives, including for healthy aging, community-supported agriculture, access to healthy food, doula care, more school-based health centers, and safe staffing standards for nurses. From the Campaign for Fiscal Equity, she wants state aid for basic school funding. She advocates for lessened police contact and a community policing model with investment in education and social service programs, citing the murder of George Floyd and the shooting of Breonna Taylor.

References

External links 
 Biography at the New York State Assembly 
 Ballotpedia profile 

Living people
Democratic Party members of the New York State Assembly
Rochester Institute of Technology alumni
People from Gowanus, Brooklyn
Politicians from Brooklyn
Women state legislators in New York (state)
21st-century American politicians
21st-century American women politicians
African-American state legislators in New York (state)
1964 births
21st-century African-American women
21st-century African-American politicians
20th-century African-American people
20th-century African-American women